Rudi Valenčič (born 26 July 1941) is a former Yugoslav cyclist. He competed in the individual road race and the team time trial events at the 1968 Summer Olympics.

References

External links
 

1941 births
Living people
Yugoslav male cyclists
Olympic cyclists of Yugoslavia
Cyclists at the 1968 Summer Olympics
People from the City Municipality of Nova Gorica